Zinabou Touré was a Togolese politician. She  was one of six women elected to the Parliament of Togo in 1979; the others were Abra Amedomé, Cheffi Meatchi, Kossiwa Monsila, Essohana Péré, and Adjoavi Trenou.

References

Members of the National Assembly (Togo)
Possibly living people
20th-century Togolese women politicians
20th-century Togolese politicians
Year of birth missing
20th-century Togolese people